OASIS International Hospital (Chinese name: 北京明德医院, Pinyin: Běijīng Míngdé Yīyuàn) is a full service private hospital in Beijing, People’s Republic of China. OASIS opened in February, 2012.

Overview 
OASIS International Hospital offers a full range of medical treatment, imaging, and laboratory work, designed to meet international standards of care. The hospital is located north of Beijing’s 798 Art District in a 15,000m² facility with 60 inpatient beds and 24/7 emergency care. Its staff are multilingual and its doctors are internationally trained. Languages spoken by doctors include: English, Chinese, Japanese, French, Spanish, German, Dutch, Korean, and Persian. The hospital has direct billing with most major international insurance providers.

References

External links 
 The OASIS International Hospital official website in English
 The OASIS International Hospital official website in Chinese
 Agenda Magazine

Hospital buildings completed in 2012
Hospitals in Beijing
2012 establishments in China